Midnight Sun Marathon may refer to:

 Tromsø Midnight Sun Marathon in Norway
 Nunavut Midnight Sun Marathon in Canada

See also

 Midnight Sun Run, a 10 K race in Fairbanks, Alaska